is a Japanese politician of the Liberal Democratic Party, a member of the House of Representatives in the Diet (national legislature). A native of Rubeshibe, Hokkaido, raised in Tokyo and graduate of Rikkyo University, he was elected to the first of his three terms in the assembly of Shiga Prefecture in 1991 and then to the House of Representatives for the first time in 2003.

References

External links 
  in Japanese.

Members of the House of Representatives (Japan)
People from Kitami, Hokkaido
People from Tokyo
People from Shiga Prefecture
1947 births
Living people
Liberal Democratic Party (Japan) politicians
Rikkyo University alumni
21st-century Japanese politicians